Martin Garbus (born August 8, 1934) is an American attorney. He has argued cases throughout the country involving constitutional, criminal, copyright, and intellectual property law. He has appeared before the United States Supreme Court, as well as trial and appellate courts throughout the United States. He has argued and written briefs that have been submitted to the United States Supreme Court; a number of which have resulted in changes in the law on a nationwide basis, including one described by Justice William J. Brennan as "probably the most important due process case in the Twentieth Century". An international observer in foreign elections, he was selected by President Jimmy Carter to observe and report on the elections in Venezuela and Nicaragua. Garbus also participated in drafting several constitutions and foreign laws, including the Czechoslovak constitution. He also has been involved in prisoner exchange negotiations between governments. He is the author of six books and over 30 articles in The New York Times, The Washington Post and the Los Angeles Times. Shouting Fire is a documentary film about his life and career. He received the Fulbright Award for his work on International Human Rights in 2010. In 2014, University College Dublin's Literary and Historical Society honored Garbus with the James Joyce Award for Excellence in Law. The same year Trinity College awarded him for his human rights and free speech work. He has represented dissidents in amongst other places such as China, Russia, Czechoslovakia, India, India, South Africa, and Taiwan.

The Guardian called Garbus "one of the world’s finest trial lawyers" and the "founding partner of one of America’s most prestigious law firms". The New York law Journal called him "one of America's finest criminal lawyers...a legendary criminal lawyer." In 2007, Business Week called him "legendary", "a ferocious lawyer who has received numerous media citations as one of America’s leading trial lawyers" and a "ferocious litigator". Time magazine named him "legendary, one of the best trial lawyers in the country." Fortune magazine called him, "One of the nation's premier First Amendment attorneys", and "legendary".  Reuters called him a "famed lawyer" while other media have called him "America's most prominent First Amendment lawyer" with an "extraordinarily diverse practice" and "one of the country's top ten litigators." Super Lawyers Magazine designated him as a Superlawyer. New York magazine and Los Angeles magazine have named him both as one of America's best trial lawyers, and one of America's best intellectual property lawyers.

Education
Garbus graduated from the Bronx High School of Science in 1951. He earned his undergraduate degree at Hunter College in 1955 and his Juris Doctor from New York University Law School. During that time he drove a taxi for two years in New York and worked at The Ford assembly line in Tarrytown, New York. He thereafter attended Columbia University as a master's candidate in economics, at The New School as a master's candidate in English and at New York University Law School as a master's candidate in law. He was admitted in New York, and six other states and federal appeals courts, to the United States Supreme Court Bar in 1963.

Early career and legal scholarship

After law school and after two years in the United States Army, he clerked for Emile Zola Berman, an internationally known trial lawyer who represented Sirhan Sirhan,  and Ephraim London, a Supreme Court advocate and Constitutional lawyer whose firm represented Alger Hiss, and who won every one of the nine cases he argued before the Supreme Court. He was in 1966 co-director of the Columbia University Center on Social Policy and Law while he taught law at Columbia. He was director counsel of the Roger Baldwin Foundation of the ACLU, legal director and associate director of the ACLU, as well as director of the Lawyers Committee to Defend Civil Rights, ran for political office in 1974 and formed his own law firm, Frankfurt Garbus in 1977. He subsequently taught at an adjunct professor at Yale Law School, and has lectured at many law schools in the United States and abroad, including Harvard and Stanford. A Fulbright scholar, he taught in 2005 and 2006 at Tsinghua and Renmin law schools in Beijing, China. At the same time he represented Chinese dissidents, he taught the judges, government officials and drafters of China's new copyright and intellectual property laws. He also participated in "rule of law" seminars in Shanghai and Beijing.

Notable cases

Garbus was involved in the following notable cases:

 Represented Herbert Blyden, the leader of the Attica rebellion.
Argued in the Supreme Court after a trial in Alabama, Garbus won, in King v. Smith (392 U.S. 309), a unanimous 9–0 decision striking down laws in 14 states on the grounds they violated the Constitution. These laws had disenfranchised over two million people.
 Served as co-counsel in Ashton v. Kentucky (384 U.S. 195), and won a Supreme Court decision that effectively ended all criminal libel laws in the United States
 Served as co-counsel in Jacobellis v. Ohio (378 U.S. 184), and won where the Supreme Court held unconstitutional an Ohio statute seeking to regulate motion pictures and, for the first time, defined the term "national community standards" that led to the ending of prosecution of obscenity cases in the United States.
 Served as co-counsel in Goldberg v. Kelly, 397 U.S. 254 (1970) New York, an entitlement case in the Supreme Court that Justice William Brennan called, "probably the most important due process case of the Twentieth Century." that he considered "the proudest achievement of his entire service on the Court."
 Unindicted co-conspirator in the criminal prosecution of Daniel Ellsberg.
 Represented Lenny Bruce in a criminal case in New York, successfully asserting a First Amendment defense against an obscenity charge.
 Represented Don Imus when he was fired by CBS by asserting a First Amendment defense.
 Represented Viking Press and Peter Matthiessen in one of the longest and most bitterly fought libel cases in American history that led to the development of libel precedent favoring journalists and publishers. Governor William Janklow filed a libel suit in South Dakota and FBI agents filed suit in Minnesota claiming they were libeled by the book In the Spirit of Crazy Horse (see Peter Matthiessen#Crazy Horse lawsuits). The South Dakota court rejected Governor Janklow's attempt to stop Penguin from publishing the book.  The Sixth Circuit Court of Appeals affirmed the dismissal of the $450 million case and the Supreme Court refused to reverse it.
 Represented 16 defendants in murder cases, stopping executions, while chairing the Committee to Abolish Capital Punishment.
 Represented Leonard Peltier in a clemency petition to President Obama.
 Represented civil rights leader Cesar Chavez in free speech, commercial and criminal cases and the boycott in California and elsewhere in the United States, all in support of the United Farm Workers.
 Represented criminal defendants in the French Connection criminal cases in New York Federal Court.
 Sued Eminem and Dr. Dre in copyright suit on behalf of French composer Jacques Loussier under New York Federal Court.
 Represented author Pia Pera in a copyright dispute over "Lolita" with the estate of Vladimir Nabokov.
 Represented author Terry McMillan in a commercial suit in San Francisco Federal Court to set aside a settlement agreement.
 Represented songwriter and pianist Oksana Grigorieva against actor Mel Gibson. Grigorieva alleged that Gibson beat her during their relationship and then defamed her in the media.
 Defended Chief Justices of the Indian Supreme Court during The Emergency.
 Defended the Cuban Five, accused of murder in the Florida Federal Courts before the United Nations and in their application for clemency to President Obama.
 Defended Sikh nationalists before the Punjab Court and in the United Nations.
 Defended media defendants and investors in libel and other commercial cases brought by fraudulent Chinese reverse merger corporations in the New York State courts.
 Defended Chinese dissidents in Beijing and Shanghai.
 Sued by South African government for disbarment due to articles Garbus wrote in The New York Times and The New York Review of Books criticizing South Africa's legal process. The case was dismissed on First Amendment grounds.
 International elections observer with President Jimmy Carter's commission.
 Represented Jane Doe in a libel suit against The New York Daily News and Mike McAlary.
 Represented The Metropolitan Opera against attempts at censorship of The Death of Klinghoffer.
 Represented freelance gossip columnist Roger Friedman who was fired by Fox News after he wrote a review on an unfinished film by viewing a bootlegged copy of the movie online.

Other clients include Nelson Mandela, Andrei Sakharov, Václav Havel, Samuel Beckett, Al Pacino, Daniel Ellsberg, Philip Roth, Michael Moore, Sean Connery, Michael Caine, Michael York, Lauren Bacall, Agnes Martin, Pace Gallery, Estate of Mark Rothko, Robert Mapplethorpe, Cincinnati Museum of Fine Art, Robert Redford, Spike Lee, Sally Mann, Allen Ginsberg, Kathy Boudin, Garry Marshall, Marilyn Monroe, Igor Stravinsky, Nora Ephron, Salman Rushdie, Simon & Schuster, Random House, Bertelsmann, Penguin Books, Putnam, Grove Press, The Sundance Film Festival, Alger Hiss, Ecuadorian plaintiffs, Estate of John Cheever, Julie Taymor, Justices in India, Knopf, Leonard Weinglass, Michael Bloomberg, Michael York, Mississippi Freedom Democratic Party, Philip Roth, Rwanda, Sean Connery, Sonny Mehta, Sophia Loren to clients, Steven Donziger, Susan Sontag, Viking Penguin, and William Kunstler.

In January 2021, Garbus called on the New York State Bar Association and one of the Appellate Divisions of the New York Supreme Court to disbar Rudy Giuliani following the 2021 United States Capitol attack where in a prior "Save America" rally, Giuliani encouraged "trial by combat."

Public speaking
Garbus has participated in lectures and debates before the American Bar Association, the Bar Associations of New York, Washington and Los Angeles on a variety of topics including trial practice, jury selection, copyright and the Supreme Court. Garbus debated former Independent Prosecutor Kenneth Starr at venues across the country. He served as a commentator for NBC, ABC, CBS, PBS, Charlie Rose, CNN, Fox News, Court TV, CCTV in China and the BBC, Time and Newsweek. Garbus has written numerous pieces for The New York Times, the Los Angeles Times, The New York Review of Books, The Nation, and Huffington Post.

Garbus' career is set forth in the award-winning HBO documentary Shouting Fire: Stories from the Edge of Free Speech.

Garbus spoke with journalist Christiane Amanpour about challenges to free speech, including social media, political vitriol, and the role of the media. He also spoke with Daniel Lelchuk, who runs the Talking Beats podcast, for a discussion of the first amendment—what it really means, and how perhaps, in this social media dominated era, there are implications that go far beyond what previously would have been just a person yelling in the town square that is reported by the local newspaper.

Garbus is also a TED speaker, where he presented on Free Speech and the First Amendment.

International work 

Garbus has worked for the governments of the former Soviet Union, Czechoslovakia, Poland,and China  as a consultant on constitutional, media and communications law. Recently in 2002, the government of China hired Garbus to help address the problems posed by digital piracy. He represented dissidents Václav Havel, Nelson Mandela  and Andrei Sakharov.  In 2004, he was appointed advisor to the Chinese team responsible for the creation of China's intellectual property laws.

He has travelled to Russia, former Czechoslovakia, Rwanda, China, Cambodia, Italy, North and South Vietnam, South Korea,  Vietnam India, South  Africa, Israel, the West Bank, Egypt, Ukraine, Bangladesh, Taiwan, Germany, Spain defending human rights. He taught law in China, Czechoslovakia, and South Africa. He also worked on the writing of constitutions in four countries.

Personal life 
Garbus' has two daughters.  Director and producer Liz Garbus who is married to producer Dan Cogan, and the author and teacher Cassandra Garbus.

Awards and recognition

Garbus has won several awards for his work:

PEN USA First Amendment Award of Honor, 2007,
New York University Law Alumni Achievement Award, 2004,
Hunter College Law Alumni Achievement Award, 2005
Hunter College Hall of Fame, 2005
Marquis Who's Who in America (2017 and prior years)
Marquis Who's Who in American Law (2017 and prior years)
Civil Liberties Union Award, 2007
Senator William Fulbright Award for global leadership in international law, 2012
James Joyce Award from the University of Dublin for Excellence in Law, 2014
Trinity College Award for defending First Amendment cases, 2014

Books
 The Next 25 Years: How the Supreme Court Will Make You Forget the Meaning of Words Like Privacy, Equality and Freedom (Seven Stories Press 2007)
 Courting Disaster: The Supreme Court and the Unmaking of America Law (Times Books, New York, 2002; Times Books softcover, 2003)
 Tough Talk: How I Fought For Writers, Comics, Bigots, and the American Way, introduction by David Halberstam (Random House-Times Books, 1998, Times Books softcover, 1999)
 Traitors and Heroes (Athenaeum, 1987; Random House softcover, 1988)
 Ready for the Defense  (Farrar Straus & Giroux, 1971; Avon softcover, 1972, and Carroll & Graf reprint, 1995)
  North of Havana: The Untold Story of Dirty Politics, Secret Diplomacy, and the Trial of the Cuban Five (The New Press; Illustrated edition, 2019)
   The Candy Store, to be published 2021

Appearances in films

Shouting Fire: Stories from the Edge of Free Speech, directed by Liz Garbus
The American Ruling Class written by Lewis Lapham
This Film Is Not Yet Rated directed by Kirby Dick discussing the Motion Picture Association film code
Lenny Bruce: Swear to Tell the Truth directed by Robert Weide
The First Amendment Project: No Joking, directed and written by Bob Balaban
Frankie and Johnny, produced by Paramount, directed by Garry Marshall
Dear God, Produced by Paramount, directed by Garry Marshall
 "American Masters, Biography of Philip Roth" 2013

References

External links

 
 Garbus, Martin, "The Damage Done by a ‘Lucky Guy’", New York Times, April 3, 2013. 
Conversation: Peter Matthiessen, PBS, April 2009

 America’s Invisible Inferno A book review in The New York Review of Books and a related article in the Los Angeles Times.
  It’s Time for President Obama to Grant Clemency to Leonard Peltier: An editorial by Martin Garbus in The Nation. And a related article in The New York Review of Books.

Living people
21st-century American lawyers
Hunter College alumni
Place of birth missing (living people)
New York University School of Law alumni
Yale Law School faculty
People from the Bronx
The Bronx High School of Science alumni
20th-century American lawyers
1934 births